Agrisius vernalis is a moth of the subfamily Arctiinae. It is found in China (Guangdong).

References

Moths described in 2012
Endemic fauna of China
Lithosiini
Moths of Asia